Novak Djokovic defeated Andy Murray in the final, 7–6(7–5), 6–7(4–7), 6–3, 6–0 to win the men's singles tennis title at the 2015 Australian Open. It was his fifth Australian Open title and his eighth major title overall. It was also Murray's fourth runner-up finish at the event, the most in the Open Era.

Stan Wawrinka was the defending champion, but lost in the semifinals to Djokovic. It was the third consecutive year that the two met at the Australian Open; on each occasion, their encounter went to a fifth set. 

Roger Federer's streak of eleven consecutive Australian Open semifinals ended when he lost to Andreas Seppi in the third round.  The defeat marked Federer's earliest exit from the tournament since 2001.

Nick Kyrgios became the first teenager to reach the quarterfinals since Andrei Cherkasov in 1990, and the first Australian to do so since Lleyton Hewitt in 2005.  Kyrgios also became the first teenager to reach multiple major quarterfinals since Rafael Nadal in 2006.

Seeds

 Novak Djokovic (champion)
 Roger Federer (third round)
 Rafael Nadal (quarterfinals)
 Stan Wawrinka (semifinals)
 Kei Nishikori (quarterfinals)
 Andy Murray (final)
 Tomáš Berdych (semifinals)
 Milos Raonic (quarterfinals)
 David Ferrer (fourth round)
 Grigor Dimitrov (fourth round)
 Ernests Gulbis (first round)
 Feliciano López (fourth round)
 Roberto Bautista Agut (second round)
 Kevin Anderson (fourth round)
 Tommy Robredo (first round, retired because of a leg injury)
 Fabio Fognini (first round)

 Gaël Monfils (second round)
 Gilles Simon (third round)
 John Isner (third round)
 David Goffin (second round)
 Alexandr Dolgopolov (first round)
 Philipp Kohlschreiber (second round)
 Ivo Karlović  (second round)
 Richard Gasquet (third round)
 Julien Benneteau (first round)
 Leonardo Mayer  (second round)
 Pablo Cuevas (first round)
 Lukáš Rosol  (second round)
 Jérémy Chardy  (second round)
 Santiago Giraldo (second round)
 Fernando Verdasco (third round)
 Martin Kližan (second round, retired)

Qualifying

Wildcards

Draw

Finals

Top half

Section 1

Section 2

Section 3

Section 4

Bottom half

Section 5

Section 6

Section 7

Section 8

Notes
 Tommy Robredo, the 15th seed, retired in the first set of his first-round match against Frenchman Edouard Roger-Vasselin with a leg injury.
 Peter Gojowczyk retired in the fourth set of his first-round match against Spaniard Guillermo Garcia-Lopez with an ankle injury.
 Martin Kližan, the 32nd seed, retired in the fourth set of his second-round match against Portugal's Joao Sousa.
 Adrian Mannarino retired in the fourth set of his second-round match against Spaniard Feliciano Lopez due to heat exhaustion.

References
General

Men drawsheet on ausopen.com

Specific

External links
 2015 Australian Open – Men's draws and results at the International Tennis Federation

Men's Singles
Australian Open (tennis) by year – Men's singles